The Julius Erving Small Forward of the Year Award is an annual basketball award given by the Naismith Memorial Basketball Hall of Fame to the top men's collegiate small forward. Following  the success of the Bob Cousy Award which had been awarded since 2015, the award was one of four new awards (along with the Jerry West Award, Karl Malone Award and Kareem Abdul-Jabbar Award) created as part of the inaugural College Basketball Awards show in 2015. It is named after NBA’s 50th Anniversary All-Time Team player Julius Erving. The inaugural winner was Stanley Johnson and has predominantly been won by players from Villanova University, winning three awards since its inception.

Winners

Winners by school

Notes

External links
Official website

Awards established in 2015
College basketball trophies and awards in the United States